is a Japanese football player. She plays for Mynavi Sendai and Japan national team.

Club career
Sumida was born in Fujisawa on January 12, 1996. She joined Nippon TV Beleza from youth team in 2012. In 2019, she moved to Mynavi Vegalta Sendai.

National team career
In 2012, Sumida played for Japan U-17 national team at 2012 U-17 World Cup. She also played for Japan U-20 national team at 2016 U-20 World Cup and Japan won 3rd place. On April 9, 2017, she debuted for Japan national team against Costa Rica. In 2018, she was a member for 2018 Asian Cup and Japan won the championship. She played 22 games for Japan until 2018.

National team statistics

International goals

References

External links

Japan Football Association

1996 births
Living people
Wako University alumni
Association football people from Kanagawa Prefecture
Japanese women's footballers
Japan women's international footballers
Nadeshiko League players
Nippon TV Tokyo Verdy Beleza players
Mynavi Vegalta Sendai Ladies players
Women's association football midfielders
Footballers at the 2018 Asian Games
Asian Games gold medalists for Japan
Asian Games medalists in football
Medalists at the 2018 Asian Games